The Evangelical Sisterhood of Mary is an ecumenical, Lutheran based, religious order, founded in 1947 by Basilea Schlink and Erika Madauss in Darmstadt, Germany.

History

In 1948 both the founders and the first seven sisters became nuns. From then on, Dr. Klara Schlink called herself Mother Basilea and Erika Madaus adopted the name of Mother Martyria.

In 1961, the sisters opened in Jerusalem "Beit Avraham", a free kosher guesthouse for Holocaust survivors. The sisters spoke Hebrew offered their guests an opportunity to vacation in Jerusalem for eight days. Board and kosher meals were provided as well as free tours of Jerusalem. As the survivor population aged, and those still living too frail to come visit, In 2014, the sisters decided it was time to close the house. Since the house was in need of extensive renovation, the property was sold, and the sisters relocated to a smaller residence in Ain Karim.

The sisters arrived in Britain in 1969. The Canadian Branch was founded in 1980. In 1981, the community established a presence in Australia.

As of 2019, the Evangelical Sisterhood of Mary has eleven subdivisions all over the world, with in total approximately 200 sisters, about 130 of whom are situated at the motherhouse in Darmstadt, where Shabbat candles are lit every Friday evening in the chapel “as a constant reminder of the guilt of the Third Reich and as a summons to pray for Israel.” There is no formal training for one to become a sister. 

There is a men's branch, the Evangelische Kanaan Franziskus-Bruderschaft (Kanaan Franciscan Brothers).

References

Sources
Evangelical Sisterhood of Mary, History

External links
 International website of Evangelical Sisterhood of Mary
 US Website of Evangelical Sisterhood of Mary

Lutheran orders and societies
Christian organizations established in 1947
1947 establishments in Germany